Hermann Rahn (July 5, 1912 – June 23, 1990) was an early leader in the field of environmental physiology. He graduated from Cornell University in 1933. Starting out in the field of zoology with a PhD from University of Rochester (1938), Rahn began teaching physiology at the University of Rochester in 1941. It was there that he partnered with Wallace O. Fenn to publish A Graphical Analysis of the Respiratory Gas Exchange in 1955.  This paper included the landmark O2-CO2 diagram, which formed basis for much of Rahn's future work.  Rahn's research into applications of this diagram lead to the development of aerospace medicine and advancements in hyperbaric breathing and high-altitude respiration.

Rahn later joined the University at Buffalo in 1956 as the Lawrence D. Bell Professor and chairman of the Department of Physiology.  As chairman, Rahn surrounded himself with outstanding faculty and made the university an international research center in environmental physiology. He was elected to the American Academy of Arts and Sciences in 1966 and the National Academy of Sciences in 1968. He served as the President of the American Physiological Society from 1963 to 1964.

In 1981, Hermann Rahn became a founding member of the World Cultural Council.

References

External links
 

American physiologists
1912 births
1990 deaths
Founding members of the World Cultural Council
Fellows of the American Academy of Arts and Sciences
Members of the United States National Academy of Sciences
Cornell University alumni
University of Rochester alumni
20th-century American zoologists
University at Buffalo faculty
Members of the National Academy of Medicine